Barrie Michael Lace Stephen, known as Michael Stephen (born 25 September 1942), was a British Conservative Member of Parliament (MP).

Early life
Stephen was called to the Bar by the Inner Temple in 1966. In the same year he was commissioned into The Life Guards and served in the Far East, London, Windsor, and Northern Ireland until 1970. In that year he was awarded a Harkness Fellowship to read International Law in the United States, and earned a Master's degree from Stanford University. He was a postgraduate student at Harvard Law School from 1971 to 1972, where he wrote "Natural Justice at the United Nations" 67 Am. J. Int. Law 479.  He was             Assistant Legal Adviser to the UK delegation to the UN for the 26th General Assembly. On returning to England, he practised at the Bar in London, specialising in commercial law. In 1989, he married Virginia Mary de Trense. They live in Chelsea, and he is Vice-chairman of The Chelsea Society. Whilst in Parliament he served on the Environment Select Committee, and after leaving Parliament he joined the Board of Symphony Environmental Technologies Plc.

Parliamentary career
Stephen contested the Labour stronghold of Doncaster North in 1983. He was elected MP for Shoreham in 1992 and served until 1997, when his seat was abolished by boundary changes. He did not seek re-election at the 1997 United Kingdom general election. He is the author of the Bail (Amendment) Act 1993 which authorised appeals against grants of bail by magistrates, and s.36 of the Criminal Justice Act 1988 which authorised appeals against over-lenient sentences.

References
Times Guide to the House of Commons, Times Newspapers Limited, 1992

External links
 

1942 births
Living people
Conservative Party (UK) MPs for English constituencies
Members of the Bow Group
UK MPs 1992–1997
English barristers
British Life Guards officers
Stanford Law School alumni